This is a list of the highest-funded equity crowdfunding projects.

References

Highest funded equity crowdfunding projects
Highest-funded equity crowdfunding projects